Hippopus porcellanus, the china clam, is a species of bivalve in the subfamily Tridacninae. It is found in Indonesia, Palau, and the Philippines. It is a popular species for marine aquariums for its attractive shell.

References

Tridacninae
Molluscs described in 1982
Taxonomy articles created by Polbot